Bugar is a village in the municipality of Bihać, Bosnia and Herzegovina. It is the westernmost point of the country.

Demographics 
According to the 2013 census, its population was 506.

References

Populated places in Bihać